Vad is the name of several rural localities (settlements and selos) in Russia:
Vad, Komi Republic, a settlement in Yugydyag Rural-Type Settlement Administrative Territory of Ust-Kulomsky District of the Komi Republic
Vad, Nizhny Novgorod Oblast, a selo in Vadsky Selsoviet of Vadsky District of Nizhny Novgorod Oblast